Quentin Annette (born 13 January 1998) is a Guadeloupean professional footballer who plays as a midfielder for the club Club Franciscain, and the Guadeloupe national team.

International career
Annette debuted with the Guadeloupe national team in a 5–1 CONCACAF Nations League win over Sint Maarten on 7 September 2019. He was called up to represent Guadeloupe at the 2021 CONCACAF Gold Cup.

References

External links
 
 

1998 births
Living people
Guadeloupean footballers
Guadeloupe international footballers
Association football midfielders
2021 CONCACAF Gold Cup players